The Baw Baw National Park is a national park located on the boundary between the Victorian Alps and Gippsland regions of Victoria, Australia. The park contains the forest covered Baw-Baw Plateau and surrounds the Mount Baw Baw Alpine Resort.

The Baw-Baw Plateau has a number of peaks, that includes Mount Baw Baw, Mount St Gwinear, Mount St Phillack, Mount Erica and Mount Whitelaw; all largely subalpine terrane outcrops of weathered granite boulders rising from the plateau, which is covered by a forest of snow-gums, punctuated by meadows. The slopes of the plateau  within the national park form the catchment areas for the Thomson River and the Thomson Reservoir, and the Tanjil and Tyers rivers.

History
The traditional custodians of the land surrounding Baw Baw National Park are the Wurundjeri people of the Kulin Nation. Through their cultural traditions, the Gunaikurnai people identify the Baw Baw National Park as their traditional country.

The area was first explored by Europeans in 1860 by botanist Ferdinand von Mueller. The area was settled in the 1880s and 1890s, after the discovery of gold in the area. Baw Baw National Park was declared in April 1979. On 7 November 2008 the park was added to the Australian National Heritage List as one of eleven areas constituting the Australian Alps National Parks and Reserves. The Baw Baw National Park represents the southerly extent of the sub-alpine environment on mainland Australia.

Flora and fauna

The typical vegetation in the park is low-lying grasses, heathlands and snow gums, this is typically described as sub-alpine. Fauna abounds on the foothills to Baw Baw Plateau, including Leadbeater's possum, which is highly endangered and Victoria's state fauna emblem. The critically endangered Baw Baw frog (Philoria frosti), listed on the IUCN Red List, is native to the region.

The deciduous Baw Baw berry (Wittsteinia vacciniacea) may be found on the plateau.

Etymology
The national park draws its name from Mount Baw Baw. In the Australian Aboriginal Woiwurrung language the name for the mountain was thought to be variously bo-ye, meaning "ghost"; or bo-bo, meaning bandicoot. In the Bunurong language, the mountain was thought to be named Bore Bore and in the Gunai language, Bo Bo, both meaning "echo".

Activities
The major uses of the park are skiing in winter and bushwalking in summer. It is popular for cross country skiing, downhill skiing, summer bushwalking, rafting and canoeing, fishing, scenic drives and picnics. The Australian Alps Walking Track traverses its entire length, starting at Walhalla and continuing north towards the Alpine National Park. The Baw Baw section takes a bit less than three days to walk with plenty to see for those interested in botany or geology.

There is popular ski touring along the Baw Baw Plateau between Mount Baw Baw, past Mount St Phillack to Mount St Gwinear. There is a volunteer ski patrol group who run on weekends and patrol around the St Gwinear portion of the national park. They access the park from the opposite side of the plateau to the ski resort at Mount Baw Baw. Other popular skiing is Nordic skiing at Mount Baw Baw, introduced in 1972 including championship races and a ski school.

See also 

 Australian Alps National Parks and Reserves
 List of reduplicated Australian place names
 Protected areas of Victoria

References

External links

National parks of Victoria (Australia)
Gippsland (region)
Protected areas established in 1979
Australian National Heritage List
1979 establishments in Australia
Plateaus of Australia
Environment of Victoria (Australia)
Australian Alps National Parks and Reserves
Central Highlands (Victoria)